Vladislav Leonidovich Torop (born 7 November 2003) is a Russian football player. He plays for CSKA Moskow.

Club career
He joined the senior squad of CSKA Moskow as a back-up to Igor Akinfeev in August 2019. He made his debut for the main team of CSKA Moskow on 23 September 2021 in a Russian Cup game against Zenit-Izhevsk.

On 30 December 2021, he extended his contract with CSKA until the end of the 2025–26 season.

He made his Russian Premier League debut for CSKA on 7 May 2022 against Sochi.

Career statistics

References

External links
 
 
 

2003 births
Footballers from Moscow
Living people
Russian footballers
Russia youth international footballers
Russia under-21 international footballers
Association football goalkeepers
PFC CSKA Moscow players
Russian Premier League players